Enchanting Neighbor is a 2015 South Korean morning daily drama series starring Yoon Son-ha, Seo Do-young, Park Tam-hee and Yoon Hee-seok. The morning soap opera aired on SBS from January 5 to June 19, 2015, airing every Monday to Friday at 08:30 am for 119 episodes.

Cast

Main
Yoon Son-ha as Gong Soo-rae
Seo Yu-na's registered mother
Seo Do-young as Park Chan-woo
Jung Soo-hwan as young Park Chan-woo
Park Tam-hee as Choi Yi-kyung
Yoon Hee-seok as Seo Bong-gook
Seo Yu-na's registered father

Supporting

Gong Soo-rae's family
Noh Young-kook as Kong Ma-joong 
Lee Mi-young as Na Jung-boon 
Baek Min-hyun as Gong Soo-geo
Kim Su-jung as Seo Yu-na
Seo Bong-hee's daughter

Seo Bong-gook's family
Lee Deok-hee as Im Yeon-ok
Jeon Yeo-seo as Seo Bong-hee
Seo Yu-na's birth mother

Yi-kyung's family
Choi Il-hwa as Choi In-seob
Jo Yeon-woo as Choi Dae-kyung
Lee Ja-young as Lee Jung-ah
Shin Rin-ah as Park Se-bom

Extended cast
Ahn Yeon-hong as Jo Eun-shil
Seo Beom-seok as Oh Han-do
Kim Na-young as Hwang Mi-ja
Kim Gyu-sun as Jung Se-jin
Park Cheon-guk

References

External links
  
 

Seoul Broadcasting System television dramas
Korean-language television shows
2015 South Korean television series debuts
2015 South Korean television series endings
South Korean romance television series
South Korean melodrama television series
Television series by JS Pictures